Geir Kvillum (born 6 May 1959) is a Norwegian sprint canoeist who competed in the early to mid-1980s. He won a silver medal in the K-4 10000 m at the 1983 ICF Canoe Sprint World Championships in Tampere.

Kvillum also competed at the 1984 Summer Olympics in Los Angeles in the K-4 1000 m event, but was eliminated in the semifinals.

References

1959 births
Canoeists at the 1984 Summer Olympics
Living people
Norwegian male canoeists
Olympic canoeists of Norway
ICF Canoe Sprint World Championships medalists in kayak